Hoplothrips is a genus of thrips in the family Phlaeothripidae, first described in 1843 by Charles Jean-Baptiste Amyot & Jean Guillaume Audinet-Serville. The type species is Thrips corticis DeGeer, 1773.

Species
ITIS lists:
 Hoplothrips absimilis
 Hoplothrips aciculatus
 Hoplothrips agrestis
 Hoplothrips americanus
 Hoplothrips anobii
 Hoplothrips anomocerus
 Hoplothrips argus
 Hoplothrips asper
 Hoplothrips baileyi
 Hoplothrips beachae
 Hoplothrips bradleyi
 Hoplothrips brevitubus
 Hoplothrips breviventris
 Hoplothrips bruneri
 Hoplothrips caespitis
 Hoplothrips calcaratus
 Hoplothrips carpathicus
 Hoplothrips cecidii
 Hoplothrips cephalotes
 Hoplothrips claviger
 Hoplothrips connexus
 Hoplothrips corticis
 Hoplothrips cubensis
 Hoplothrips cunctans
 Hoplothrips dentatus
 Hoplothrips dentiger
 Hoplothrips detector
 Hoplothrips dignus
 Hoplothrips dissonus
 Hoplothrips dubius
 Hoplothrips edentatus
 Hoplothrips eremicola
 Hoplothrips fijiensis
 Hoplothrips flavafemora
 Hoplothrips flavicauda
 Hoplothrips flavipes
 Hoplothrips flavitibia
 Hoplothrips fumiceps
 Hoplothrips fungi
 Hoplothrips fungosus
 Hoplothrips fuscicornis
 Hoplothrips germanae
 Hoplothrips gracilis
 Hoplothrips graminis
 Hoplothrips grassei
 Hoplothrips grisescens
 Hoplothrips guineensis
 Hoplothrips hoerneri
 Hoplothrips hoodi
 Hoplothrips indicus
 Hoplothrips japonicus
 Hoplothrips karnyi
 Hoplothrips kea
 Hoplothrips kincaidi
 Hoplothrips lacteus
 Hoplothrips lanaiensis
 Hoplothrips laticornis
 Hoplothrips leeuweni
 Hoplothrips leibyi
 Hoplothrips lepidulus
 Hoplothrips lichenis
 Hoplothrips longisetis
 Hoplothrips magnaccai
 Hoplothrips magnificus
 Hoplothrips mainlingensis
 Hoplothrips marginalis
 Hoplothrips mathuri
 Hoplothrips melanurus
 Hoplothrips mendosus
 Hoplothrips militaris
 Hoplothrips minutalis
 †Hoplothrips minutatim
 Hoplothrips monspeliensis
 Hoplothrips moultoni
 Hoplothrips muscicola
 Hoplothrips mutabilis
 Hoplothrips nemorius
 Hoplothrips niger
 Hoplothrips occipitalis
 Hoplothrips orbiceps
 Hoplothrips orbiculatus
 Hoplothrips orientalis
 Hoplothrips oriochares
 Hoplothrips orites
 Hoplothrips oudeus
 Hoplothrips pallicornis
 Hoplothrips palmarius
 Hoplothrips papua
 Hoplothrips pedicularius
 Hoplothrips pergandei
 Hoplothrips perkinsi
 Hoplothrips persimilis
 Hoplothrips polypori
 Hoplothrips polysticti
 Hoplothrips poultoni
 Hoplothrips proximus
 Hoplothrips purpureus
 Hoplothrips quercinus
 Hoplothrips recticeps
 Hoplothrips ruber
 Hoplothrips rubicundulus
 Hoplothrips rugosus
 Hoplothrips rzedowskianus
 Hoplothrips semicaecus
 Hoplothrips smithi
 Hoplothrips sordidus
 Hoplothrips spissicornis
 Hoplothrips tejas
 Hoplothrips terminalis
 Hoplothrips testaceus
 Hoplothrips transvaalensis
 Hoplothrips tua
 Hoplothrips tyrannus
 Hoplothrips ulmi
 Hoplothrips unicolor
 Hoplothrips vitreus
 Hoplothrips westfalli
 Hoplothrips xanthocephalus
 Hoplothrips zacualtipanensis
 Hoplothrips zonatus
 Hoplothrips zuluensis

References

Phlaeothripidae
Thrips
Thrips genera
Taxa named by Jean Guillaume Audinet-Serville
Insects described in 1843
Taxa named by Charles Jean-Baptiste Amyot